Robert Gillies may refer to:

 Robert Gillies (New Zealand politician) (1835–1886), Member of Parliament
 Robert Gillies (Australian politician) (1876–1941), member of the New South Wales Legislative Assembly
 Robert Pearse Gillies (1789–1858), Scottish poet and writer
 Bob Gillies (Robert Arthur Gillies; born 1951), Bishop of Aberdeen and Orkney
 Robert Gillies, musician in New Zealand band Split Enz